Wierzba may refer to:

Wierzba, Łódź Voivodeship
Wierzba, Warmian-Masurian Voivodeship, a village in the Gmina Ruciane-Nida

See also
 
 MPP-B Wierzba mine, a fibreglass Polish minimum metal anti-tank blast mine